No Maps on My Taps is a 1979 American documentary film directed by George Nierenberg. The film recounts the history of tap dancing in America through the lives of three influential tap dancers, Chuck Green, Howard Sims, and Bunny Briggs, and showcases their dancing skills in a historic live performance at Smalls Paradise nightclub in Harlem.

The film is a wistful tribute to the careers of the performers and to an art form that at the time of filming seemed to be waning. According to a review in The New Yorker, "Ironically, “No Maps on My Taps,” whose participants regarded it as an elegy, helped to start a tap revival in the eighties. The film was shown in festival after festival. Its stars travelled with it and danced, live, after the screenings."

The film won an Emmy Award for Outstanding Musical Direction in News and Documentary.

Structure
The dancers all recount their biographies and influences while rehearsing for a gala performance at a nightclub. Scenes of the performers dancing and kidding each other are interspersed with archival images and film footage of their early days. Also shown are archival film scenes featuring performances by John W. Bubbles and Bill Robinson. The film ends with a climactic dance-off in front of a live audience, with music provided by a jazz band fronted by Lionel Hampton.

References

External links 
 

1979 films
1979 documentary films
American documentary films
Films set in New York City
Films shot in New York City
1970s English-language films
1970s American films